Porto Azzurro is a comune (municipality)  in the Province of Livorno in the Italian region Tuscany; it is on the island of Elba, located about  southwest of Florence and about  south of Livorno. It was formerly called Porto Longone, and in 1557 Iacopo VI Appiani, Prince of Piombino, granted Spain the right to build a fortress there, so it was transferred to the State of the Presidi that it was born as a direct possession of the crown of Spain. The state had only governors sent by the central Spanish government first and then Austrian. In 1801, Napoleon established the Kingdom of Etruria. Eventually it was transferred to the Grand Duchy of Tuscany.

See also
Capo Focardo Lighthouse

References

Cities and towns in Tuscany
Elba
Populated coastal places in Italy